The Battle of Cesenatico was a minor battle in the Neapolitan War that took place on 23 April 1815 in the town of Cesenatico on Adriatic coast. 

The main Neapolitan army, commanded by their king, Joachim Murat, was retreating to their original headquarters in Ancona following a string a defeats in northern Italy. The Neapolitans were being pursued by an Austrian corps under the command of Adam Albert von Neipperg. During the evening of the 23 April, while a Neapolitan garrison of 3,000 men were stationed in the town, a small force of 600 Austrians hussars and jägers rushed the single stone bridge into the town. In the ensuing fighting, the Austrians brought out 200 prisoners with only minor casualties while inflicting moderate casualties on the garrison. 

The following day, the rest of the Austrian advanced guard arrived at the town to find the Neapolitans had already left during the night.

Citations

References

Further reading 
Capt. Batty, An Historical Sketch of the Campaign of 1815, London (1820)
Details of battle at Clash of Steel

External links 

Conflicts in 1815
Battles of the Neapolitan War
Battles involving Austria
Battles involving the Kingdom of Naples
1815 in Italy
1815 in the Austrian Empire
April 1815 events
Battles in Emilia-Romagna